A Hindu legend based on oral traditions holds that Lahore, known in ancient times as Nokhar (City of Lava in Sanskrit),
was founded by Prince Lava,
the son of Goddess Sita and Lord Rama; Kasur was founded by his twin brother Prince Kusha.
To this day, Lahore Fort has a vacant Lava temple dedicated to Lava (also pronounced Loh, hence Loh-awar or "The Fort of Loh"). It is one of various etymological theory of Lahore's origin.

The oldest authentic document about Lahore was written anonymously in 982.  It is called Hudud-i-Alam (The Regions of the World).  In 1927 it was translated into English by Vladimir Fedorovich Minorsky and published in Lahore.  In this document, Lahore is referred to as a small shehr (city) with "impressive temples, large markets and huge orchards." It refers to "two major markets around which dwellings exist," and it also mentions "the mud walls that enclose these two dwellings to make it one." The original document is currently held in the British Museum. Lahore was called by different names throughout history.  To date there is no conclusive evidence as to when it was founded.  Some historians trace the history of the city as far back as 4000 years ago. However, historically, it has been proved that Lahore is at least 2,000 years old. Lying on the main trade and invasion routes to South Asia, Lahore has been ruled and plundered by a number of dynasties and hordes.

Claudius Ptolemeus

It was about the time referred to by Colonel Tod as the probable period of Prince Kanaksen's migration from Lahore, namely, the middle of the 2nd century that Claudius Ptolemeus, surnamed Ptolemy, the celebrated astronomer and geographer, wrote his geography, which was used as a textbook by succeeding ages. He flourished in Alexandria in 139 AD; and there is evidence of his having been alive in 161 AD. In his geography he mentions a city called Labokla, situated on the route between the Indus River and Pataliputra (Patna), in a tract of country called Kasperia (Kashmir), described as extending along the rivers Bidastes (Jhelum River), Sandabal or Chandra Bhaga (Chenab River), and Adris (Ravi River). This place, from its name and locality, Wilford would identify with Lahore. With this inference General Cunningham agrees, identifying Lahore with the Labokla of Ptolemy, and taking the first two syllables, Labo, to represent the name of Lava (or Lov), the son of Rama. The identification was, according to the same authority, first made in Kiepert's Map of India according to Ptolemy, which accompanied Lassen's ‘Indische Alterthums Kunde.’ Therefore, strong evidence exists on the origin of city at the time of Ramayana.

Alexander Burnes

Alexander Burnes was a British explorer and a diplomat associated with The Great Game. Noticing the traditions of Cabul in his travels, he writes of Lahore,

“It is said that Cabool was formerly named Zabool, from a kaffir, or infidel king, who founded it; hence the name of Zaboolistan. Some authors have stated, that the remains of the tomb of Cabool, or Cain, the son of Adam, are pointed out in the city; but the people have no such traditions. It is, however, a popular belief, that when the devil was cast out of heaven, he fell in Cabool. In Cabool itself there are not exactly traditions of Alexander, but both Herat and Lahore are said to have been founded by slaves of that conqueror, whom they call a prophet. Their names were Heri (the old name of Herat) and Lahore. Candahar is said to be an older city than either of these.”

But the entire absence of the name of Lahore, or any city with a name approaching it, which may be fairly identified with it, in the writings of the historians of Alexander, coupled with the fact that no coins of Indo-Bactrian or Indo-Scythic dynasties have been discovered at Lahore or in its neighbourhood.

Xuanzang

Xuanzang, pronounced as Hsüan-tsang, was a Chinese buddhist monk, scholar, traveller, and translator, who visited the Punjab in seventh century (630) A.D. He describes the town of Lahore as, “chiefly inhabited by brahmins.”. The city has strong cultural roots in brahminical traditions which were lost with the invasion by Arabs.

François Bernier

François Bernier, who visited Lahore in 1664 AD, suggests its identification with the ancient Bucephalus. Burnes would identify Lahore with Sanghala, mentioned by Arrian and Curtius, the classical writers, as the stronghold of the Kathaean or Khatri tribe. This is the Sanghala of Alexander, mentioned also by Diadorus, and recognized as the Sakala of the Brahmans and the Sagal of the Buddhists. But its position, 65 miles from the bank of the Hydraotes (Ravi), precludes the identity of its situation with that suggested by the enterprising traveller. Yet both Curtius and Arrian agree in stating that Alexander crossed the Hydraotes (Ravi) before advancing against Sanghala to punish the insurgent Kathaeans, described as a “free Indian nation.” There can, therefore, be no doubt that the conqueror crossed the Ravi in the immediate neighbourhood of Lahore, which “was most probably the position of his camp when he heard of the recusancy of the Kathaean.” But it must have been a place of no importance at the time of the Macedonian invasion, or it would have, doubtless, been mentioned by the Greek writers.

Notes

History of Lahore